Josh Deu is the co-founder of Canadian indie rock band Arcade Fire. He and Win Butler co-founded Arcade Fire in late 1999. Deu formally left the band in late 2003. He went on to co-found the Los Angeles-based animation and visual effects house known as BLEACH FX LLC. Deu has served as a producer and director in various forms of media, currently working on the film Black Moon, Music Video such as Arcade Fire Tunnels, Rebellion, Laika, Lightning I, II. Josh is also a major stakeholder in Attica Sciences (biotech) and Athos Pharmaceuticals.  In addition, Josh is working with TNG (www.takenewground.com) consultancy with Dan Tocchini, Mark Edwards, and Adrian Koehler. Josh is also writing and producing a web series with SNL alum, Chris Kattan called "Hey Kattan" and an animated television show with the legendary Mike Swaim, Cracked TV Veteran 2005-2014.

Career

Arcade Fire (1999–2003)
Deu and Win Butler began to work on both visual and musical collaborations. They formed Arcade Fire, with Deu and Butler initially sneaking into a practice space at McGill University to write and rehearse. While practising there, they met music student Régine Chassagne, whom Butler had previously seen performing. Deu noted, "Win and I played guitar. Everyone played guitar. We had a lot of music to show her, but played none of it, she ended up saying yes to joining us, and I don’t know why. Maybe there was a little spark with Win." Deu subsequently designed the band's initial website alongside Win's brother and future band member, William Butler.

After a "profound spiritual experience," Deu began to prioritize filmmaking and visual - interactive projects and collaborations, and left the band in late 2003, stating: "It just didn’t feel like it fit me anymore." Deu, however, continued to collaborate with the band on promotional materials, web content, and music videos, noting in 2010: "Not everyone gets to have these experiences forming a famous rock band and then helping develop their aesthetic. I’m so blessed to have been part of who the band was at the beginning, and who they’ve become now."

Regarding his friendship with Deu, Butler noted in 2004, "In the beginning, I started a band called The Arcade Fire with my best friend Josh Deu (who was the best man at my wedding this last summer, and who designed the website with my little brother Will). He was also the reason I moved to Montreal (because he had gone to school up here, and had great things to say about it). He still adds little bits to a bunch of the songs and helped write the music to "Headlights" "Power Out" "Neighborhood" from our demo EP and other songs off [Funeral]".

Production

Deu's animation projects Include The Alchemysts, "Black Moon Rising" "The Gift of the Dolphin, Hey Kattan YouTube Sketch comedy series.     

Deu co-wrote the tracks, "Neighborhood #1 (Tunnels)" and "Neighborhood #3 (Power Out)", on the band's debut studio album, Funeral (2004), and the song, "Quiet" "Tremalo" "In the Attic", "Headlights Look Like Diamonds", many the band's debut EP and first album "Funeral", Arcade Fire (2003). Deu and Butler co-wrote over 50 songs that remain largely unreleased.

Formerly in Declare Productions LLC (BLEACH FX LLC)(www.bleachhaus.com) (Operating under "Deep Water") Westworld Season 3, Counterpart, Magicians, Lethal Weapon, Training Day, The Get, MacGyver 2017/2018, Magicians Animated Sequences, Graphic Novel For Scott Free Productions, The Emperor, Queen America. 

Miscellaneous / Declare Productions LLC: Ghosts of War, Pipe Dream''

Personal life
Deu studied filmmaking and studio art at the Mel Hoppenheim School of Cinema, in Montreal, and Harvard University Extension School in Boston.  He was Win Butler's best man at his wedding to Régine Chassagne, in 2003.

References

Arcade Fire members
Musicians from Montreal
Phillips Exeter Academy alumni
Concordia University alumni
Living people
Year of birth missing (living people)